Several ships of the Swedish Navy have been named HSwMS Halland, named after Halland province:

 , a ship of the line launched in 1682 and sunk in 1722
 , a galley launched in 1749
 , a  launched in 1952 and decommissioned in 1987
 , a  launched in 1996 and commissioned in July 1997

Swedish Navy ship names